Smiling Fish And Goat On Fire is a film about brothers, made by brothers Derick Martini and Steven Martini who wrote, produced and portrayed two brothers, and directed by Kevin Jordan, writer/director of Brooklyn Lobster. Martin Scorsese served as the Executive Producer and it won the Discovery Award at the Toronto International Film Festival. The film also won the Audience Award at the 2000 Milan International Film Festival.  It was released theatrically in September 2000 by the now defunct Stratosphere Entertainment.

Cast
 Derick Martini as Chris Remi
 Amy Hathaway as Alison
 Steven Martini as Tony Remi
 Heather Moudy as Nicole (as Heather Jae Marie)
 Wesley Thompson as Burt
 Melba Englander as Nurse
 Rena Riffel as Party Girl #2

References

External links
 

2000 films
American independent films
2000s English-language films
1990s English-language films
1990s American films
2000s American films